Douglas High School (DHS) is a public high school in Winston, Oregon, United States.
The school had a graduation rate of 72% in 2014

Academics
In 2008, 50% of the school's seniors received their high school diploma. Out of 111 students, 88 graduated, 22 dropped out, 1 received a modified diploma, and 12 are still in high school.

Notable alumni
Josh Bidwell - football punter, 11 years in the NFL (Green Bay, Tampa Bay, and Washington). 
Dennis Boyd (American football) - football lineman, played 5 years with the Seattle Seahawks.
Troy Polamalu - football safety, 2020 Pro Football Hall Of Fame inductee, businessman, actor.

Notable faculty
Bill Wold, professional basketball player

References

High schools in Douglas County, Oregon
Public high schools in Oregon